The Migratory Bird Treaty or Convention is an environmental treaty between Canada and the United States.  It was originally signed on 16 August 1916 by the United States and the United Kingdom, (representing Canada), entered into force on on 6 December 1916 and has since been amended several times.

Implementation 
This treaty led to important environmental legislation being passed in each of the two countries in order to implement the terms of the treaty.

Implementation in Canada 

The Migratory Birds Convention Act (also MBCA) is a Canadian law established in 1917 and significantly updated in June 1994 which contains regulations to protect migratory birds, their eggs, and their nests from hunting, trafficking and commercialization. A permit is required to engage in any of these activities.  One major outcome of the act was the creation of Federal Migratory Bird Sanctuaries (MBSs).

Implementation in the United States 

Under United States Code Title 16, Chapter 7, Subchapter II, the Migratory Bird Treaty Act of 1918 is the United States legislation implementing the convention between the U.S. and Great Britain (for Canada). It replaced the Weeks-McLean Act, which had become effective in 1913 though faced constitutional challenges.  The Migratory Bird Treaty Act was also challenged in the case Missouri v. Holland and the supremacy of ratified international treaties gave it additional protection.  The United States subsequently entered into similar agreements with four other nations (Canada, Mexico, Japan and Russia) to protect migratory birds. The statute makes it unlawful to pursue, hunt, take, capture, kill or sell birds listed therein ("migratory birds").  The statute does not discriminate between live or dead birds and also grants full protection to any bird parts including feathers, eggs and nests. Over 800 species are currently on the list.

The statute is broken down into ten sections, 703 through 712 (16 U.S.C. 703 through 712). Note that § 709 is omitted, but § 709a Authorization of appropriations is included and active, making eleven listed sections (including § 709 Omitted).

See also 
 Bird Day
 International Convention on the Protection of Birds

References 

1916 in Canada
1916 in the United States
Canada–United States treaties
Environmental treaties
Treaties concluded in 1916
Treaties entered into force in 1916
Bird conservation
1916 in the environment
Treaties of the United States
Treaties of the United Kingdom (1801–1922)
Treaties extended to Canada
Animal treaties
United Kingdom–United States treaties
Wildlife law
Bird migration